The hornet robberfly, Asilus crabroniformis, is a species of predatory insect in the family Asilidae.

Reaching more than 25 mm in body length, it is one of the largest flies in the United Kingdom. and feeds on grasshoppers, dung beetles and other flies. Unlike an actual hornet, the robberfly only has one yellow patch on its abdomen and one pair of wings. The larvae are believed to feed on dung beetle larvae and other detritivores.

Asilus crabroniformis  can be found in woodland clearings and well-drained areas of heaths and downs covering Southern England and South & West Wales. It is reliant on the availability of rabbit or cattle dung.

It is a member of the robberfly family Asilidae, subfamily Asilinae and is included in the list of endangered species in the British Isles.

References

Asilidae
Insects described in 1758
Taxa named by Carl Linnaeus